"Long Hot Summer" is a song co-written and recorded by Australian country music artist Keith Urban. It was released in June 2011 as the third single from his 2010 album Get Closer. They reached number one on the U.S. Billboard Hot Country Songs chart for the week of 22 October 2011. Urban wrote this song with Richard Marx.

Critical reception
Nate Chinen of The New York Times wrote that the song was "one of the friskier tunes" on the album. Dan Milliken of Country Universe gave the song a B grade, saying that it is the "closest he’s come in two albums to capturing his old uptempo spark." Coyne states the song could function as a "prequel to the melancholy, ''Til Summer Comes Around'". Billy Dukes of Taste of Country gave the song four and a half stars out of five, saying that the only criticism is the "early guitar work that runs beneath the song’s first verse" and that "only the grouchiest of grouchies can frown on."

Music video
The music video was directed by Trey Fanjoy and premiered on 16 August 2011 on CMT. It featured Summer Glau as the female lead.

Charts

Weekly charts

Year-end charts

Certifications

References

2011 singles
2010 songs
Keith Urban songs
Songs written by Keith Urban
Songs written by Richard Marx
Song recordings produced by Dann Huff
Music videos directed by Trey Fanjoy
Capitol Records Nashville singles